Charles Elyan Costes (born 16 September 2002) is a French professional footballer who plays as a winger for Dijon II.

Career 
On 5 February 2019, Costes signed with Dijon. He made his professional debut with Dijon in a 1–0 Ligue 1 win over Saint-Étienne on 23 May 2021.

References

External links
 

2002 births
Living people
French footballers
Association football wingers
Dijon FCO players
Ligue 1 players
Championnat National 3 players